Ōhura is a small town in the west of the North Island of New Zealand. It is located to the west of Taumarunui in the area known as the King Country, in inland Manawatū-Whanganui. It lies on the banks of the Mangaroa Stream, a tributary of the Ōhura River which is a tributary of the Whanganui River.

Background
In July 2020, the name of the locality was officially gazetted as Ōhura by the New Zealand Geographic Board.

Ōhura was the centre for coal mining in the region, operating through to circa 1965, where previously the mines, railway network and farming had been major parts of the local industry.

A proud piece of the town is the Ohura Museum which provides a repository for much of the history of Ōhura and the surrounding area.

Te Rukirangi Marae and Papakainga meeting house is located in Ōhura. It is the tribal meeting ground of the Ngāti Maniapoto hapū of Te Rukirangi.

Demographics

The population of Ohura was 126 in the 2018 New Zealand census, a decrease of 3 (-2.3%) since the 2013 census, and a decrease of 36 (-22.2%) since the 2006 census. There were 78 males and 51 females, giving a sex ratio of 1.53 males per female. Ethnicities were 114 people  (90.5%) European/Pākehā, 27 (21.4%) Māori, 0 (0.0%) Pacific peoples, and 0 (0.0%) Asian (totals add to more than 100% since people could identify with multiple ethnicities). Of the total population, 12 people  (9.5%) were under 15 years old, 12 (9.5%) were 15–29, 60 (47.6%) were 30–64, and 42 (33.3%) were over 65.

Otangiwai-Ohura 

Otangiwai-Ohura had a population of 1,020 at the 2018 New Zealand census, a decrease of 66 people (-6.1%) since the 2013 census, and a decrease of 213 people (-17.3%) since the 2006 census. There were 423 households. There were 546 males and 477 females, giving a sex ratio of 1.14 males per female. The median age was 43.4 years (compared with 37.4 years nationally), with 204 people (20.0%) aged under 15 years, 153 (15.0%) aged 15 to 29, 519 (50.9%) aged 30 to 64, and 144 (14.1%) aged 65 or older.

Ethnicities were 84.4% European/Pākehā, 30.3% Māori, 1.5% Pacific peoples, 1.8% Asian, and 0.9% other ethnicities (totals add to more than 100% since people could identify with multiple ethnicities).

The proportion of people born overseas was 8.2%, compared with 27.1% nationally.

Although some people objected to giving their religion, 56.5% had no religion, 29.7% were Christian, 0.6% were Buddhist and 3.2% had other religions.

Of those at least 15 years old, 78 (9.6%) people had a bachelor or higher degree, and 204 (25.0%) people had no formal qualifications. The median income was $27,300, compared with $31,800 nationally. The employment status of those at least 15 was that 453 (55.5%) people were employed full-time, 138 (16.9%) were part-time, and 30 (3.7%) were unemployed.

Education

Notable people 
 Frank Glasgow, All Black rugby player

References

External links
King Country places - Ōhura, Te Ara - the Encyclopedia of New Zealand
Ohura website

Populated places in Manawatū-Whanganui